Ladies Invite Gentlemen is a 1980 Soviet comedy film directed by Ivan Kiasashvili.

Plot 
The film tells about a woman who dreams of a happy personal life, but she is unlucky.

Cast 
 Marina Neyolova as Anya Pozdnyakova
 Natalya Andreychenko as Raisa
 Mariya Vinogradova as Aunt Klava
 Tatyana Bozhok as Marina
 Leonid Kuravlyov as Sanya Svintsov
 Aleksandr Fatyushin as Victor
 Nikolay Karachentsov as Valentin
 Valeriy Nosik as Moremukhin
 Aleksandr Solovyov as Sergey
 Gia Peradze as Anzor

References

External links 
 

1980 films
1980s Russian-language films
Soviet romantic comedy films
1980 romantic comedy films